The Committee of Voters of Ukraine (CVU) is an all-Ukrainian non-government organization whose main task is to observe the election campaigns, maintain relations between voters and the authorities, and protect the voting rights of citizens. Branches of the organization operate in 24 regions and in more than 200 districts of Ukraine. The NGO was established on February 20, 1994. The organization declares itself as neutral to political parties and candidates, acts on the basis of voluntariness, equality of its members, self-government, legality and transparency.

During the period of its activity, based on the methodology developed by the organization, which took into account all key standards of election observation, the CVU monitored all national election campaigns, without exception, as well as most local election campaigns.

CVU stated that the Ukrainian local elections 2020 which took part on 25th October were democratic.

References

External links
 Committee of Voters of Ukraine official website

Organizations based in Kyiv
Political organizations based in Ukraine
Election and voting-related organizations
Non-profit organizations based in Ukraine
Elections in Ukraine